Yolanda Kettle (born 1988) is an English actress known for playing Camilla Fry in The Crown (2017), Dolly Wilcox in Howards End  (2017), and Joy Pelling in the BBC political drama Roadkill (2020).

Early life 
Yolanda Kettle was born in 1989 in Birmingham, England. Her mother is Spanish and her father English. She went to King Edward VI Camp Hill School in Birmingham. After leaving secondary school, she moved to London to study acting at the London Academy of Music and Dramatic Art (LAMDA). Kettle is also an alumna of the National Youth Theatre

Career
Kettle's first major role was on stage at the Arcola Theatre as Nina in Anton Chekhov’s The Seagull alongside Geraldine James in 2011. She played Dolly Wilcox in Howards End in 2017, and in the same year had a role in series 2 of The Crown, playing Camilla Fry, wife of chocolate entrepreneur Jeremy Fry, both of whom were friends with Princess Margaret's love interest, Antony Armstrong-Jones. In 2020, Kettle played the role of Joy Pelling in the BBC political drama Roadkill.

Kettle joined the cast of a new Netflix and MRC Jane Austen film Persuasion; filming began in the UK in June 2021.

Filmography

Film, video, live streaming, and theatre

Television

References

External links 
 
 Independent Talent Profile Yolanda Kettle
 Yolanda Kettle Instagram

Living people
21st-century English actresses
English people of Spanish descent
Alumni of the London Academy of Music and Dramatic Art
English film actresses
English television actresses
National Youth Theatre members
People from Birmingham, West Midlands
1988 births